Parliamentary elections were held in Austria on 3 October 1999. Although the Social Democratic Party remained the largest party in the National Council, a right-wing coalition government was formed by the Freedom Party of Austria (FPÖ) and the Austrian People's Party (ÖVP) after several months of negotiations. Although the FPÖ had finished a fraction of a point ahead of the ÖVP in the popular vote, ÖVP leader Wolfgang Schüssel became Chancellor rather than controversial FPÖ leader Jörg Haider. Haider, who had also been elected Landeshauptmann of Carinthia, was not appointed to the cabinet and resigned as party leader.

However, foreign governments remained critical of the FPÖ's inclusion in the government and the fourteen other member countries of the European Union imposed sanctions on the country, whilst domestically the government faced protests organised by the SPÖ and Greens. However, this pressure on the government helped stabilise it and when it became clear that the FPÖ was not going to be excluded from government, sanctions were lifted.

Voter turnout was 80.4%.

Contesting parties 
The table below lists parties represented in the 20th National Council.

Results

Results by state

References

Elections in Austria
Austria
Legislative
Austria